The Malagasy sheldgoose (Centrornis majori) is an extinct monotypic species of large goose in the shelduck subfamily. It was described from subfossil remains radiocarbon dated to about 17,000 years ago, found in central Madagascar.

References

Malagasy sheldgoose
Pleistocene birds of Africa
Extinct birds of Madagascar
Malagasy sheldgoose
Fossil taxa described in 1897